Turkson is a surname. Notable people with the surname include:

Ato Turkson (1933–1993), Ghanaian composer and musicologist
Kwamena Turkson (born 1976), Swedish boxer
Peter Turkson (born 1948), Ghanaian Catholic cardinal